Ummey Kawsar Salsabil Hena is a Jatiya Party (Ershad) politician and the former Member of Bangladesh Parliament from a reserved women's seat.

Career
Hena was elected to parliament from a reserved women's seat as a Jatiya Party candidate in 1986.

References

Jatiya Party politicians
Living people
3rd Jatiya Sangsad members
Year of birth missing (living people)
Women members of the Jatiya Sangsad
20th-century Bangladeshi women politicians